Eugène Watier (21 November 1914 – 7 November 1974) was a French weightlifter. He competed in the men's bantamweight event at the 1948 Summer Olympics.

References

1914 births
1974 deaths
French male weightlifters
Olympic weightlifters of France
Weightlifters at the 1948 Summer Olympics
Sportspeople from Paris
20th-century French people